Association football, also known as football or soccer, is a popular recreation sport in New Zealand. The sport is administered in New Zealand by the governing body New Zealand Football (NZF). It is the third-most popular men's team sport after rugby union and cricket.

Among New Zealand adults in 2000, it was the 12th most participated in sport, at seven percent. Among boys ages 5–17, it was the most participated in sport, with a 17 percent participation rate; among girls, it ranks fifth in popularity at six percent, behind swimming, netball, horse riding, and tennis.

Administration
Six regional federations participate in the administration and promotion of the sport in New Zealand:

Federation One (Northern Region Football) - Northland and Auckland
Federation Two (WaiBOP Football) - Waikato, Bay of Plenty and King Country
Federation Three (Central Football) - Gisborne, Hawke's Bay, Taranaki, Manawatū-Whanganui
Federation Four (Capital Football) - Greater Wellington, including the Kapiti Coast and Wairarapa
Federation Five (Mainland Football) - Tasman, Marlborough, Nelson, West Coast, Northern and Central Canterbury
Federation Six (Southern Football) - South Canterbury, Otago, Southland

History and achievements

The first Chatham Cup final was played in October 1923, when Seacliff from Otago defeated Wellington YMCA 4–0. The Chatham Cup has become New Zealand football's longest-running club competition.

The women's version of the Chatham Cup was founded in 1994. Originally called the Women's Knockout Cup it was renamed in 2018 to the Kate Sheppard Cup in honour of Kate Sheppard on the 125th anniversary of the women's suffrage movement in New Zealand. Lynn-Avon United holds the record for most titles with nine.

New Zealand's senior men's side, the All Whites, has qualified twice for the FIFA World Cup. In 1982 the qualification was notable in that New Zealand played more matches (15) and traveled further (55,000 miles) than any other team to qualify. Grouped with Brazil, Scotland and the USSR, New Zealand did not win any of their matches. They also qualified for the 2010 FIFA World Cup in South Africa having far more success on the field than in 1982. The All Whites drew 1–1 with Slovakia and defending champion Italy and had a 0–0 draw with Paraguay. They were the only team to remain undefeated in the competition.

New Zealand also participated in the 2009 FIFA Confederations Cup, also in South Africa. They were placed in Group A with Iraq, South Africa, and Spain. New Zealand lost their opening match 0–5 against Spain before losing 0–2 to South Africa. However, the team earned New Zealand's first competition point at a FIFA Confederations Cup after drawing 0–0 with Iraq.

New Zealand hosted the 1999 FIFA U-17 World Championship, with matches played in Auckland, Napier, Christchurch and Dunedin. New Zealand also hosted the inaugural FIFA U-17 Women's World Cup in 2008, with matches hosted in Auckland, Hamilton, Wellington and Christchurch.

New Zealand's under-23 team, the "Oly-Whites", qualified for their first Olympic Games appearance in 2008 for the Beijing Summer Olympics. The team have then gone on to also play at the 2012 and 2020 Summer Olympics.

The New Zealand's women's team, nicknamed the Football Ferns, also qualified for their first Olympic appearance in 2008 and at each games since in 2012, 2016 and 2020. In addition to this, the Football Ferns have participated in the FIFA Women's World Cup qualifying for the first one in 1991. Then again in 2007, 2011, 2015 and 2019. They will jointly host the 2023 with Australia. New Zealand won the 1975 AFC Women's Championship, defeating Thailand 3–1 in Hong Kong.

Professional football

Fully professional football began in 1999 with the induction of the Auckland-based Football Kingz FC into Australia's National Soccer League (NSL). Despite having a record of poor attendances, Auckland was included in the A-League competition when the NSL was scrapped in favour of an eight-franchise A-League. The Kingz were re-branded as New Zealand Knights FC but still only managed to draw small crowds. In their final season, the average attendance for the Knights was 3,014, well below the average of the next lowest attracting team—Perth Glory averaging 7,671.

During the later stages of the 2006–07 season, Football Federation Australia (FFA) removed the New Zealand Knights's (NZK) A-League licence due to the club's financial and administrative problems and poor on-field performance. After the resignation of the NZK board, the FFA transferred the licence to New Zealand Soccer for them to administrate the rest of the club's season before its subsequent dissolution.

After these events, the FFA granted a provisional competition licence for New Zealand Soccer to sub-let to a suitable, New Zealand-based team to take the place left vacant by the defunct Knights. After much delay from both the FFA and NZS, Wellington property magnate Terry Serepisos was selected as the owner of the new franchise. The team, eventually named Wellington Phoenix FC, would be based at Wellington's Westpac Stadium and coached by Ricki Herbert. Herbert also held the responsibility of coaching the New Zealand national team. With only three months to prepare, the Phoenix faced a first season without a proper pre-season and with a much smaller talent pool to recruit from.

The first game in Phoenix history, a 2–2 draw with then-reigning champion Melbourne Victory, set a new national record for attendance at a competitive football fixture at 14,421. The cumulative attendance over the first three home matches exceeded that of the Knights entire cumulative attendance from both years of their existence. The national attendance record was later exceeded a second time, with 18,345 turning out for a 1–2 loss against Adelaide United. The Phoenix followed this match with an exhibition friendly against Los Angeles Galaxy, including their marquee player David Beckham. The attendance from this match of 31,853 set a new national record for attendance at any football match which was only broken by the game the national team played with Bahrain to qualify for the 2010 World Cup.

Wellington finished its first season last in the league on goal differential, having equal points with seventh-placed Perth Glory, and only earned one more ladder point than the Knights had the previous season. Despite this, Phoenix was declared the success story of the 2007–08 season by the FFA.

On 7 March 2010 a new attendance record for a club football fixture was set in Wellington during play-off match against Newcastle Jets. Phoenix won 3–1 in the extra time in front of 32,792 fans.

National competitions

The current national senior men's competition is the New Zealand National League which is a club based competition. The competition is contested by ten teams, with teams qualifying from their regional leagues. Four teams qualify from the Northern League, three qualify from the Central League, two qualify from the Southern League and the Wellington Phoenix Reserves are automatically given a spot each year. The regional leagues runs from March through to September, with each league having a varying number of games. The Championship phase runs after the completion of the regional phase, with each team playing each other once, followed by a grand final. Each season, two clubs gain qualification to the OFC Champions League, the continental competition for the Oceania region.

The originally national senior men's football competition was the National Soccer League. The NSL was founded in 1970 and consisted of club based teams qualifying from their regional leagues. The NSL ceased to exist after the 2003 season, being replaced by the ISPS Handa Premiership, a professional/semi-professional franchise league which ran from 2004 to 2021.

The Women's National League was founded in 2004 and, unlike its male counterpart, the teams were run by the different regional federations. It has a brief hiatus in 2008 before returning in 2009 and including not only the regional federations but different team New Zealand Football Development teams run by New Zealand Football. In 2021, it went through another change, moving slowly to club based like the men's competition, starting with a Northern League where four club teams will qualify and play off with the regional federations representing Central, Capital, Mainland and Southern.

The Chatham Cup is a national knockout competition in the style of England's FA Cup. It is the oldest competition, having been contested since 1923. It is open only to clubs from the regional winter competitions - Wellington Phoenix FC are not eligible to compete. The competition runs alongside the winter club seasons, beginning in April and usually concluding in September.

The Kate Sheppard Cup is the women's national club based knockout competition that was first played in 1994. Originally called the Women's Knockout Cup, it changed its name to its current one in 2018.

Regional competition

Premier winter club competition is divided into four regional leagues:
 The Northern League, consisting of teams from Federations One (North Harbour/West Auckland), Two (Auckland) and Three (Waikato/Bay of Plenty)
 The Central League, consisting of teams from Federations Four (Central North Island) and Five (Greater Wellington)
 The Capital Football W-League, is a Women's Football league consisting of teams from Federations Four (Central North Island) and Five (Greater Wellington)
 The Mainland Premier League, consisting of teams from Federation Six (Upper South Island)
 The FootballSouth Premier League, consisting of teams from Federation Seven (Lower South Island)

National Champions

Men's

Women's

*Home team for final

References

External links
New Zealand Football
ISPS Handa Premiership
Wellington Phoenix FC